Alireza Khorshidi  (born 16 May 1951) is an Iranian retired football forward who played for Iran from 1971-1978. He competed in the 1976 Asian Cup where Iran won their third championship title. He also played for Iran at the 1976 Summer Olympics. Khorshidi played club football for Homa.

Honours

Asian Cup:
Winner : 1976

References

External links
Team Nelli Stats

Iran international footballers
1951 births
Living people
Iranian footballers
Homa F.C. players
1976 AFC Asian Cup players
Association football forwards
Olympic footballers of Iran
Place of birth missing (living people)
AFC Asian Cup-winning players
People from Khorramabad
Footballers at the 1976 Summer Olympics